1947 Academy Awards may refer to:

 19th Academy Awards, the Academy Awards ceremony that took place in 1947
 20th Academy Awards, the 1948 ceremony honoring the best in film for 1947